On 30 May 2018, a female police officer traveling on a high-speed train in Flensburg, Germany, was stabbed by a knifeman who next attacked a male passenger who came to her aid. The perpetrator was then shot by the officer. The motive behind the stabbing is not yet clear. The incident is not considered terrorism.

Attack 
Police and prosecutors confirmed following progression of events: a female police officer, 22 years old, who was traveling off-duty on the train but wearing her uniform, was on the way to the exit inside a train, when she was attacked by the presumed perpetrator with a kitchen knife as she moved towards the exit door. A fellow passenger, 35 years old, tried to separate the police officer and the attacker, whereupon the perpetrator turned on him, attacking and injuring the passenger who had gone to the aid of the officer; he was left with serious injuries and a broken arm.  His counterattack did succeed in drawing the assailant away from the officer, enabling her to draw her service revolver and shoot the perpetrator, killing him.  News reports in the first several days after the attack misstated the facts, reporting that the  perpetrator had quarreled with the passenger who went to the officer's aid and attacked him before attacking the officer.

Although it was initially reported that there were no witness, a witness did come forward and confirm the events of the attack.

Attacker 
The attacker was a 24 years old Eritrean refugee who arrived in Germany in September 2015. According to officials, he had attacked a neighbour with an iron rod in April. He was also suspected of having previously threatened people with a knife.

Aftermath 
The interior minister of Germany, Horst Seehofer, commented that violence could never be tolerated regardless of whether it was directed towards the police or the people.

The Flensburger Tageblatt reported that no Deutsche Bundesbahn security employees were on board the train.  A spokesman from the Press Office of the Federal Police in Potsdam said that in dangerous situations aboard trains, travelers should show notify authorities and "show moral courage."

Sources 

2018 crimes in Germany
Attacks in Europe in 2018
May 2018 crimes in Europe
Stabbing attacks in 2018
Stabbing attacks in Germany
Crimes against police officers in Germany
Flensburg